This Is the Six is the debut studio album by British metalcore band While She Sleeps. It was released on 13 August 2012 through Search and Destroy Records. The album was produced by Carl Bown. Preparation for the album began in late 2010 to early 2011, with recording beginning on 1 November 2011 and wrapping up in February 2012. The title track "This Is the Six" was released as the first single from the album on 13 May 2012. The band have stated that the album will showcase a more polished and progressive sound than their previous material. The album debuted at #27 on the UK Album Chart.

Background and recording
Work on While She Sleeps' first full-length album began shortly after the release of their third mini-album The North Stands for Nothing. In a video published by the band in October 2010, vocalist Lawrence Taylor spoke of how they'd begun work on new material and that it is "just the beginning of the thinking process". Throughout most of 2010 and 2011 the band toured heavily in UK and Europe, working on new material between tours at their home studio in Sheffield, England. On 15 March 2011, While She Sleeps released the single "Be(lie)ve", originally described as a way of putting out some new material to bridge the gap between albums. It later appeared as the eighth track on the new album. Much of the initial writing for the album was attributed to lead guitarist Sean Long. Bassist Aaran Mackenzie describes him as "the main riff writer" while drummer Adam Savage explains, "[Long] does a lot of pre-pros, then he brings it to the band and we'll have a listen and a jam". In October 2011, the band released a video discussing their plans for the next album, stating that they had written 10 tracks and  "found the sound of the record". Despite their preparation, the band said that things could change as they are "not a band that gets a track fully finished before recording it", allowing them the freedom to "still make some final decisions in the studio".

On 1 November 2011, While She Sleeps entered Chapel Studios in Lincolnshire, England to begin recording drums for the album. After all the drums were tracked, the band moved to Treehouse Studios in Chesterfield, England, to record the rest of the album. This was the first time the band had recorded their music in a professional recording studio and worked with a producer. When speaking about working with producer Carl Bown, guitarist Long said that "it's cool having someone we don't really know giving us input" adding that he thinks they need that "outsiders view". He also stated that they changed songs as they went along, with guitarist Welsh commenting that "we're going with a really gut instinct" and trying different ideas on the spot. Recording for the majority of the album ended some time in December, however, some extra piano parts were recorded at an undisclosed studio in Wales in February 2012.

Composition

Influences, style and themes
Prior to the release of the album, band members promised that the general sound of This Is the Six would be similar to The North Stands for Nothing but "a lot more polished". Adding that, "the melodic parts you’re used to will be more melodic and the heavy parts heavier". Vocalist Taylor explained that "[the band] went in to recording without a genre in [their] heads", adding that they just wanted to write together without worrying about the result. While discussing the album with BBC Radio 1 DJ Daniel P. Carter, guitarist Long said that "some of the stuff we do on the album you couldn't really do as a straight hardcore band or a straight metal band", concluding that "it kind of clashes in-between". Many critics have described This Is the Six as metalcore.

The album title refers to the close relationship that While She Sleeps have with their fans – 'The Six' are the five members of the band and their fan base. The band also call themselves 'Sleeps' for short and there is 6 letters in that name, as well as referring to their fans as the 'Sleeps Army'. Taylor revealed in an interview that the lyrics on the album follow a general theme about the current state of England. When talking about the track "Love at War", he explained; "that's just about how our forefathers have fought for our country and the respect that we feel like they don't get [from] a lot of people".

Release and promotion
On 3 April 2012, Daniel P. Carter premiered the track "Dead Behind the Eyes" on BBC Radio 1 – subsequently playing it twice in the same show due to high demand. Later that day, While She Sleeps released a music video and free download for the track on the Kerrang! website. On 17 April, Carter premiered the title track "This Is the Six" on his BBC Radio 1 show. Alongside a music video, the track was released as the first single from the album on 13 May 2012. The following day, the single was played by Fearne Cotton and Nick Grimshaw on their respective BBC Radio 1 shows. In contrast to their appearances on Carter's show (which is broadcast between 12:00am and 2:00am) this was not the first time While She Sleeps had been played on national radio during the day, as Alex Baker played them on national radio during the day. Their appearance on Cotton's show was met with a mixed reception from her listeners. Bassist Mackenzie said in an interview "it was weird for something that heavy to be played at about 11:30am" and that it "split the country", drummer Savage added that they "kind of liked how much it pissed [some] people off". On 25 June, Carter premiered the track "Seven Hills" on his BBC Radio 1 show, and on 5 July he premiered "Love at War" while sitting in for Zane Lowe's show. This Is the Six was originally scheduled for release on 6 August 2012, however it was postponed and released on 13 August 2012 through Search and Destroy Records.

Critical reception

This Is the Six received mostly positive reviews and critical acclaim from music critics. AllMusic noted that although While She Sleeps were largely overshadowed in their scene by Bring Me the Horizon, the record sounded promising enough that "they might not be second-best for too much longer."

Track listing
All songs written and composed by While She Sleeps.

Deluxe boxset
A limited edition boxset includes a This Is the Six CD, a 'Behind the Scenes' DVD, an exclusive T-shirt, poster, 'Metal (as fuck)' pin badge, 'Sleeps Army' dog tags and a unique letter – your invitation to the 'Sleeps Army' – numbered, one of a kind.

Personnel
Credits adapted from Discogs.

While She Sleeps
 Lawrence "Loz" Taylor – lead vocals
 Mat Welsh – rhythm guitar, vocals, piano
 Sean Long – lead guitar, backing vocals
 Aaran McKenzie – bass, backing vocals
 Adam "Sav" Savage – drums, percussion

Additional musicians
 Andrew Neufeld of Comeback Kid – guest vocals on track 1, "Dead Behind the Eyes"

Additional personnel
 Carl Bown – production, mixing
 Martyn Ford – additional production
 Jim Finder – engineering, recording
 Colin Richardson – mixing
 Andy Sneap – mastering
 Craig Jennings and Olly Mitchell – management
 Jon Barmby – design

References

2012 debut albums
While She Sleeps albums
Search and Destroy Records albums
Sony Music albums
The End Records albums